Guildford Park Secondary is a grade 8 through 12 Secondary School in North Surrey, British Columbia. It is located just west of the Port Mann Bridge and Guildford Town Centre, in a suburban inner-city community close to Holly Park.  Guildford Park Secondary has  over 1200 students, and it is proud of its cultural and ethnical diversity.  It has students from all over the world, as 51 different languages other than English are spoken by students as their first language.

Mary Jane Shannon 
Mary Jane Shannon was born in the Surrey area in 1876, making her one of the first and perhaps most famous pioneers to be born in Surrey, BC. Her father, Thomas, was an Irishman and a sailor by trade. In the early 1860s he emigrated from the US and established a homestead on the Fraser River. 
Her mother, Mary Robertson, was Indian-English, and from Saskatchewan.

The young Miss Shannon was eager to find organized Women's Groups. During the Boer War and the First World War she organized overseas aid and a Women's Army Auxiliary. She was also an advocate of giving women the vote.

Her literary career began early with some small booklets that gained moderate success. She also wrote a series of books on this area and won the vote of most of the people across Canada. She soon became noted in literary societies abroad for her speeches.

On January 19, 1959, she was on hand with local dignitaries for the opening of Mary Jane Shannon Elementary School. Shortly afterward she was forced into retirement because of failing health and died soon after.

Mr. Tongue 
The first principal since the opening of school in 1959 until 1973.

Mr. Masi 
The principal who changed the school's name from Mary Jane Shannon to Guildford Park Community school.

Mr. Cooper 
The first Vice-Principal of the school.

Programs

After School Tutoring 
Guildford Park Secondary has an after-school tutoring program that is free for the students.  Students can receive tutoring Tuesday, Wednesday, or Thursday between 2:45 and 4:15 pm in the library.  Senior Students can also apply to be a tutor and help other students.  Students who are tutors are paid for their help and receive their payment in a scholarship at the end of the year.

Aboriginal Student Support 

Guildford Park Secondary has an Aboriginal Student Support Team which includes an Aboriginal Support Teacher, two Aboriginal Youth Care Workers, a Counsellor, and a Vice-Principal.  The team provides academic, emotional-social, and cultural support for Aboriginal students.  The office is located in the main school foyer and students can connect with members of the team at the office throughout the school day.

Extra-Curriculum

Athletics
The Athletics Department at Guildford Park provides students with opportunities to represent the school in multiple sport activities. Guildford Park participates in the following extra-curricular sports: Soccer, Freestyle Wrestling, Volleyball, Rugby, Basketball, Badminton, Ultimate Frisbee, Ball Hockey, and Ice Hockey. The Guildford Park wrestling team has won provincial high-school championships in 2004, 2008, and 2009 and has consistently finished the top ten every year. The Guildford Park ice hockey team won the division championship for Surrey High School Hockey League in 2014.

2019-2020 Guildford Park Athletics Teams:

Fall:
Junior Boys´ Soccer,
Senior Boys´ Soccer,
Grade 8 Girls´ Volleyball,
Grade 8 Boys´ Volleyball, 
Junior Girls´ Volleyball,
Junior Boys´ Volleyball,
Senior Boys´ Volleyball, 
Senior Girls´ Volleyball, and Cross-Country.

Winter:
Wrestling, 
Hockey,
GP Dance Team,
Grade 8 Boys´ Basketball, 
Grade 8 Girls´ Basketball,
Junior Boys´ Basketball,
Junior Girls´ Basketball,
Senior Girls´ Basketball, and Senior Boys' Basketball.

Spring:
Badminton,
Track and Field, 
Junior Girls´ Soccer,
Senior Girls´ Soccer,
Grade 8 Boys´ Rugby, 
Junior Boys´ Rugby, 
Senior Boys´ Rugby, 
Senior Girls´ Rugby, and Ultimate.

Clubs
Guildford Park Secondary offers a number of different clubs to support students' interests.  Students interested in starting a club can do so by getting a group together, finding a sponsor teacher, and getting approval of the administration.  If traveling is involved, students are required to provide their own transportation. The list of the clubs includes, but not limited to GSA ( GP's Gay-Straight Alliance), Garden Club, Green Team, Culture Club, Sabres Donation Club, Women of Change, and more.

Departments  
https://www.surreyschools.ca/schools/guildfordpark/Departments/Pages/default.aspx

References

  2014 Staff List
 2014 School Information
 Guildford Park Greco-Roman Wrestling, 2012

External links

School Reports - Ministry of Education
 Class Size
 Satisfaction Survey
 School Performance
 Skills Assessment

High schools in Surrey, British Columbia
Educational institutions established in 1984
1984 establishments in British Columbia